The Asanka, earthenware dish, is a Ghanaian grinding pot that is made out of clay with ridges inside. It is one of the kitchen tools commonly used in Ghanaian homes. it comes with a wooden masher called eta or tapoli in the local language. It is commonly referred to as traditional blender and appropriately used where there is no electricity. It is also called a 'pounding pot.' The Ga' s call it Kaa whiles the Akans call it apotoyewaa or Asanka. It is commonly used in the chop bars as serving bowls.

History 

Earthenware dish is one of the oldest kitchen tools in Ghana and can be found in almost every Ghanaian home.  it is an integral part of Ghana's culture and known as  one of the old pottery professions in Ghana among the women of some districts, Indigens of some towns in the  Eastern, Bono and Ashanti regions of Ghana involved in the mass production of pottery items includes Amanfrom, Besease, Jejeti, Mpraseso, Oframoase, Tanoso etc.

How to use 
The use of Asanka requires skill, forearm strength, and correct technique to prevent sore wrists. Ingredients are chopped into pieces prior to placing into the Asanka to make grinding easier. Ridges in the Asanka reduce overall surface area in contact with ingredients, enabling it to grind effectively. Forceful use of a wooden masher, the eta or tapoli, uses the friction between the ridges to mix the ingredients. Repeating the process will pulverize and mix the ingredients over time.

Uses 
 grinding and crushing ingredients
 de-hulling of black-eyed peas (beans)
smoking and steaming ingredients, a special cooking technique among the Akans, crushed and heated on a stove, which is commonly called abom.
Serving bowl used in the chop bars for local dishes like fufu, banku, konkonte and riceballs with soups.

Safety 
It has to be cleaned and taken care of to ensure its durability.

References 

Food grinding tools
Ghanaian culture

External Links 
How to use Apotoyewa

Production of Asanka or Apotoyewa